Charles Blamphin (1830? – June 20, 1895) was a British composer and harpist.  Among his popular compositions were When the Corn Is Waving, Annie Dear (1860) and Just Touch the Harp Gently, My Pretty Louise (with lyrics by Samuel N. Mitchell) (1870).

References

External links

U.S. Library of Congress, 1921 recording of When the Corn is Waving, Annie Dear by the Peerless Quartet

1830s births
1895 deaths
19th-century British composers